Fast Food Tycoon 2, also known as Pizza Connection 2 in Europe, is a business simulation game on the PC in which the player starts out as the owner of a small pizza parlor and must gain popularity and eventually own the pizza empire. A sequel of Fast Food Tycoon, Fast Food Tycoon 2 incorporates a variety of variables of which the player must overcome to reach unique goals in 10 different international cities, ranging from New York City to Moscow to Tokyo. A sequel Pizza Connection 3 was slated for 2018 release.

References

External links

Fast Food Tycoon 2 at Tycoon HQ

2001 video games
Activision games
Business simulation games
Organized crime video games
Single-player video games
Software 2000 games
Video game sequels
Video games about food and drink
Video games developed in Germany
Windows games
Windows-only games